Rafat Bayat is an Iranian politician and former parliament member.  She was denied candidacy for both the 9th Iranian presidential election and the 10th Iranian presidential election by the Guardian Council.

Bayat studied sociology and belongs to the conservative party. If allowed to run, she would have been the first woman to contest the presidency since the 1979 Islamic revolution.

References

Living people
Members of the Women's fraction of Islamic Consultative Assembly
People from Zanjan, Iran
Deputies of Zanjan and Tarom
Members of the 7th Islamic Consultative Assembly
1958 births
21st-century Iranian women politicians
21st-century Iranian politicians